André Raposo (born February 10, 1978) is a water polo player from Brazil. Nicknamed Quito he competed in two consecutive Pan American Games for his native country, starting in 2003. Cordeiro won two silver medals at this event with the Brazil men's national water polo team.

References
  Profile

1978 births
Living people
Brazilian male water polo players
Water polo players from Rio de Janeiro (city)
Pan American Games silver medalists for Brazil
Pan American Games medalists in water polo
Water polo players at the 2003 Pan American Games
Water polo players at the 2007 Pan American Games
Medalists at the 2003 Pan American Games
Medalists at the 2007 Pan American Games
21st-century Brazilian people